Giannis Alexiou (born 8 December 1984) is a Greek football player who plays for German Oberliga Niederrhein club SC St. Tönis 11/20.

Career
Born in Drama, Alexiou began playing football with Megas Alexandros Irakleia F.C. in the Delta Ethniki. He signed on 3. July 2012 with German Oberliga Niederrhein club KFC Uerdingen.

Notes

External links
 
Profile at Guardian's Stats Centre
Profile at EPAE.org

1976 births
Footballers from Drama, Greece
Living people
Greek footballers
Association football defenders
Pandramaikos F.C. players
Veria F.C. players
Levadiakos F.C. players
KFC Uerdingen 05 players
TV Jahn Hiesfeld players
Super League Greece players
Football League (Greece) players
Regionalliga players
Oberliga (football) players
Greek expatriate footballers
Expatriate footballers in Germany
Greek expatriate sportspeople in Germany